Hacıdünyamalılar (Hajidunyamalilar, formerly known as Vəng) is a village in the Kalbajar District of Azerbaijan.

References 

Populated places in Kalbajar District